Yohannan VI bar Nazuk was Patriarch of the Church of the East from 1012 until his death, which is given by various sources as being in 1016 or 1020.

Life
The following account of Yohannan's patriarchate is given by Bar Hebraeus:

After the death of Yunanis a quarrel arose among the bishops over the appointment of his successor.  After a long period of wrangling they drew lots for three candidates.  The name of Yohannan bar Nazuk, bishop of Hirta, was drawn, and everybody agreed with this result.  He was consecrated at Seleucia in the fifth month of the year 403 of the Arabs [AD 1012].  He prayed over the deposed bishops, restoring them to their dignity, and transferred others from one seat to another, not out of necessity but in return for bribes.  He fulfilled his office for around eight years, and died on a Sunday, on the twenty-third day of tammuz [July] in the year 411 of the Arabs [AD 1020].

See also
 List of patriarchs of the Church of the East

References

Citations

Bibliography
 Abbeloos, J. B., and Lamy, T. J., Bar Hebraeus, Chronicon Ecclesiasticum (3 vols, Paris, 1877)
 Assemani, J. A., De Catholicis seu Patriarchis Chaldaeorum et Nestorianorum (Rome, 1775)
 
 Brooks, E. W., Eliae Metropolitae Nisibeni Opus Chronologicum (Rome, 1910)
 Gismondi, H., Maris, Amri, et Salibae: De Patriarchis Nestorianorum Commentaria I: Amri et Salibae Textus (Rome, 1896)
 Gismondi, H., Maris, Amri, et Salibae: De Patriarchis Nestorianorum Commentaria II: Maris textus arabicus et versio Latina (Rome, 1899)

Patriarchs of the Church of the East
11th-century bishops of the Church of the East
Nestorians in the Abbasid Caliphate
1020 deaths